The 93rd Scripps National Spelling Bee was held at the ESPN Wide World of Sports Complex in Bay Lake, Florida. The finals were held on July 8, 2021, and televised on ESPN2 and ESPN. It was won by Zaila Avant-garde, the first African American to win the Scripps National Spelling Bee, and the second black person to do so (after Jody-Anne Maxwell of Jamaica).

Field 
Due to the COVID-19 pandemic, the 2020 spelling bee has been cancelled for the previous year. 

For 2021, the first round was held virtually on June 12 and had 209 spellers from the United States and several other countries. There were eleven finalists: ten Americans and one Bahamian, the first from his country to make it to the final.

Competition 
Jill Biden, the current First Lady of the United States, attended in person. She previously attended back in 2009.

The competition went 18 rounds in total. The third-to-last speller was eliminated in round 14 after misspelling athanor, a type of alchemical furnace. Avant-garde and the runner-up, Chaitra Thummala, then competed head-to-head for three rounds. In the last of these, Thummala misspelled neroli oil, giving Zaila Avant-garde the opportunity to spell murraya correctly for the victory.

Avant-garde is the second black person to win the competition, after Jody-Anne Maxwell of Jamaica, who remains the only person not from the United States to do so.

New rules 
The 2021 National Spelling Bee was the first edition to introduce the spell-off round, in which all the contestants, in numerical order, spell the list of championship words in 90 seconds. They can still ask for definition, language of origin, part of speech, alternate pronunciations, and the use in a sentence, but that will be part of the 90-second period. The contestant who spells the most words correctly in the spell-off round will be declared champion. However, in the actual final, the round was not used, as the Bee did not run overlong.

Word list championship round

See also 

 List of Scripps National Spelling Bee champions

References

Scripps National Spelling Bee competitions
2021 in Florida
2021 in education